BBC Alerts was a free-to-use desktop software package issued by the BBC (but developed by Skinkers Ltd.) that allows users to see news as it happens on a scrolling desktop news ticker or as a pop-up alert every hour. Users can customise what news topics they are interested in.

On 30 March 2011, BBC announced they would close the service within weeks.

References

BBC New Media